Bongiovanni da Recanati or Giacomo Veneri de Racaneto (died 1460) was a Roman Catholic prelate who served as Archbishop of Dubrovnik (1440–1460).

On 5 September 1440, Bongiovanni da Recanati was appointed during the papacy of Pope Eugene IV as Archbishop of Dubrovnik.
On 18 September 1440, he was consecrated bishop by Biaggio Molino, Titular Patriarch of Jerusalem, with Daniel Rampi Scoto, Bishop of Concordia, and Zanone Castiglione, Bishop of Bayeux, serving as co-consecrators.
He served as Archbishop of Dubrovnik until his death on 2 September 1460.

References

External links and additional sources
 (for Chronology of Bishops) 
 (for Chronology of Bishops) 

1460 deaths
Archbishops of Dubrovnik
15th-century Roman Catholic bishops in Croatia
Bishops appointed by Pope Eugene IV